The 435th Air Ground Operations Wing is an active unit of the United States Air Force, assigned to the United States Air Forces in Europe.  It is stationed at Ramstein Air Base, Germany.

The current commander is Colonel Bryan T. Callahan, who took command in July 2021, and his command chief is Command Chief Master Sergeant Corey J. Crow.

The 435 AGOW is the second USAF wing solely dedicated to supporting battlefield airmen.  It consolidated the tactical air control party and battlefield weather specialties of the 4th ASOG, the contingency communications support of the 435th Air and Space Communications Group, and the expeditionary support to assess, prepare and operate airfields for air expeditionary forces of the CRG. Both of the groups previously part of the 86th Airlift Wing were transferred to the 435th AGOW.

Mission
The 435 AGOW comprises three groups. Each groups supports a specific portion of the wing's multifaceted mission.
 The 4th Air Support Operations Group
 The 435th Contingency Response Group
 The group is tasked with establishing airfield and aerial port operations and providing force protection at contingency airfields. The unit was activated as the 86th Contingency Response Group at Hangar 3 at Ramstein Air Base on February 26, 1999, and was the first unit of its kind in the Air Force. It incorporates more than 42 different jobs. It is a rapid-deployment unit designed to be a "first-in" force to secure an airfield and establish and maintain airfield operations.  It consists of three subordinate squadrons:
 The CRG's Air Mobility Squadron provides airfield command and control, loads and unloads aircraft and essentially sets up an aerial port where none existed.
 The CRG's Security Forces Squadron provides force protection in the opening stages of a deployment and also provides protection for any follow-on forces.  The Security Forces Squadron is capable of overland airlift, air assault, or airborne insertion into crisis situations.
 The CRG's Construction & Training Squadron provides Mission Essential Equipment Training (MEET) concentrates on specialized or unique mission-essential equipment civil engineers do not use in their day-to-day operations. MEET provides hands-on training to students for proper certifications in their CFETP and ACES PR. MEET is SORTS reportable under CAT II training. Individuals will be trained to the proficiency level prescribed in the approved MEET curriculum to set up, operate, troubleshoot, maintain and reconstitute equipment IAW Prime BEEF/Contingency Training Panel-approved objectives.
 The CRG's newly formed Detachment 1 provides an OSS type function with a core capability resting in its Air Advisor Flight. This flight is predominately responsible for military-to-military engagements with partner nations, helping increase relationships in the EUCOM and AFRICOM AORs.

 The 435th Air and Space Communications Group

Component units 
Unless otherwise indicated, units are based at Ramstein Air Base, Germany.

4th Air Support Operations Group

 2nd Air Support Operations Squadron (Vilseck, Germany)
 7th Combat Weather Squadron (Wiesbaden, Germany)

435th Air and Space Communications Group

 1st Air & Space Communications Operations Squadron
 1st Combat Communications Squadron
 1st Communications Maintenance Squadron

435th Contingency Response Group

 435th Construction and Training Squadron
 435th Contingency Response Squadron
 435th Contingency Response Support Squadron
 435th Security Forces Squadron

History
 For additional history and lineage, see 435th Operations Group

Reserve operations

In June 1949, Continental Air Command (ConAC), which had the responsibility for training reserve units, reorganized its reserve units under the wing base organization system.  As part of this reorganization and unit reductions required by President Truman’s reduced 1949 defense budget, the 435th Troop Carrier Wing was activated at Miami International Airport, and formed its cadre from the inactivating 49th Air Division and 100th Bombardment Group.  The wing was manned at 25% of normal strength but was authorized four squadrons rather than the three of active duty units.

Korean War mobilization

At Miami, the wing trained with C-46s under the supervision of the active duty 2585th Air Force Reserve Training Center.  The wing was ordered into active service in March 1951 as a result of the Korean War.  Along with other reserve units called to active duty, it formed Tactical Air Command's Eighteenth Air Force.  The 435th's initial function was to train C-46 aircrews for service in Korea. The wing also trained with Fairchild C-119 Flying Boxcars.  Although it remained at Miami, the wing deployed twice while on active duty: to Laurinburg-Maxton Airport, North Carolina from 21 July until 1 September 1951 and to Grenier Air Force Base, New Hampshire from 2 January to 3 March 1952.  It was relieved from active duty and inactivated on 1 December 1952 and its mission, personnel and equipment were transferred to the regular 456th Troop Carrier Wing, which was activated the same day.

Troop carrier operations
The wing was activated as a reserve unit the same day at the same station, but with the personnel and equipment of the inactivating 482d Troop Carrier Wing.  In the reserve, the 435th once again flew Curtiss Commandos  under the supervision of the 2585th Center.  In the summer of 1956, the wing participated in Operation Sixteen Ton during its two weeks of active duty training.  Sixteen Ton was performed entirely by reserve troop carrier units and moved United States Coast Guard equipment From Floyd Bennett Naval Air Station to Isla Grande Airport in Puerto Rico and San Salvador in the Bahamas.  After the success of this operation, the wing began to use inactive duty training periods for Operation Swift Lift, transporting high priority cargo for the Air Force and Operation Ready Swap, transporting aircraft engines between Air Materiel Command’s depots.  In addition, for the first time as a reserve unit, its flying was performed in unit tactical aircraft, rather than in trainers.

Detached Squadron Concept
During the first half of 1955, the Air Force began detaching reserve squadrons to separate locations. The dispersal of separate squadrons to smaller population centers was intended to facilitate recruiting and manning.  One of the first three squadrons to move as this policy was implemented was the 78th Troop Carrier Squadron, which was activated at Orlando Air Force Base in April 1955 after having been inactivated at Miami the previous year.  In August 1956, the wing's 77th Troop Carrier Squadron left Miami for Pinellas County Airport, Florida.  The squadron's stay in the Tampa Bay area was brief, however, for in November 1957 it moved again, this time to New Orleans Naval Air Station, Louisiana.  Only the 76th Squadron remained with group headquarters in Miami. In 1957, the wing once again received C-119s.

In 1958, the 2585th Center was inactivated and some of its personnel were absorbed by the wing. In place of active duty support for reserve units, ConAC adopted the Air Reserve Technician program, in which a cadre of the unit consisted of full-time personnel who were simultaneously civilian employees of the Air Force and also held military rank as members of the reserves.

Activation of groups under the wing
The 435th Troop Carrier Group was inactivated on 14 April 1959 when the 435th Wing adopted the Dual Deputy organization and the group's squadrons were assigned directly to the wing.  In 1960, the wing left busy Miami International Airport and moved south to Homestead Air Force Base, Florida.

Although the dispersal of flying units under the Detached Squadron Concept was not a problem when the entire wing was called to active service, mobilizing a single flying squadron and elements to support it proved difficult.  This weakness was demonstrated in the partial mobilization of reserve units during the Berlin Crisis of 1961.  The 77th and 78th Troop Carrier Squadrons converted to the Douglas C-124 Globemaster II in 1961, and were ordered to active service for the crisis, although the 76th Troop Carrier Squadron, which continued to fly the C-119, remained in reserve status. After training to become combat ready, the mobilized wing participated in worldwide airlift and tactical exercises. The wing returned to reserve status in August 1962 and the 76th Squadron was once more assigned.

To resolve the mobilization problem, at the start of 1962 ConAC determined to reorganize its reserve wings by establishing groups with support elements for each of its troop carrier squadrons.  This reorganization would facilitate mobilization of elements of wings in various combinations when needed. However, as this plan was entering its implementation phase, another partial mobilization occurred for the Cuban Missile Crisis.  The formation of troop carrier groups was delayed until January for wings that had not been mobilized.  The 915th Troop Carrier Group at Homestead, the 916th Troop Carrier Group at Donaldson Air Force Base, South Carolina and the 917th Troop Carrier Group at Barksdale Air Force Base, Louisiana, were all assigned to the wing on 17 January.  That spring, the Air Force closed Donaldson and the 916th Group moved to Carswell Air Force Base, Texas and was reassigned.  It was replaced by the 908th Troop Carrier Group at Bates Field, Alabama.  The wing's other Globemaster group, the 917th, was reassigned in July and the wing once again flew Flying Boxcars as its tactical aircraft.

The wing was inactivated in April 1965 and its groups reassigned to other reserve wings.

European airlift
Reactivated first at RAF High Wycombe, England, 24 December 1968, then moved to Wiesbaden, West Germany on 1 July 1969, the 435th served as a support wing of Military Airlift Command, providing deployed airlift control elements and aircraft maintenance at aerial ports in portions of Europe, the Middle East, Southwest Asia, and Africa.

The redesignated 435th Tactical Airlift Wing had host responsibilities for Rhein-Main AB, beginning July 1975, which included operating the busiest U.S. air terminal in Europe and supporting CONUS-based strategic airlift transiting Rhein-Main. While continuing to function as a tactical and support wing, the 435th TAW gained the mission of aeromedical evacuation in Europe and the Middle East. Provided airlift support for United States European Command (EUCOM) and Headquarters, United States Air Forces in Europe (USAFE), from March 1977 until June 1978.

Provided airlift for the theater, first with rotational Lockheed C-130 Hercules forces until early 1978, and afterward with a permanently assigned C-130 airlift squadron. Participated in joint and combined paratroop training and exercises, as well all manner of theater humanitarian airlift, including relief for natural disasters, evacuation of civilians from hostile situations, and aeromedical evacuation from combat areas.

During Operation Desert Shield/Storm, the wing's 37th Tactical Airlift Squadron, plus additional wing personnel, deployed to Al Ain, United Arab Emirates, from mid-August 1990 to late March 1991 to provide theater airlift during the Persian Gulf War.

On 1 April 1992, the wing was again redesignated as the 435th Airlift Wing and implemented USAF's objective wing concept. With the inactivation of Military Airlift Command in 1992, the wing and Rhein-Main returned to USAFE control, while an Air Mobility Command airlift support group was activated to take over operation of the air terminal and support transiting air mobility (i.e., strategic airlift, theater airlift, and air refueling) aircraft.

From July 1992 through September 1994, the wing controlled the massive airlift effort (Operation Provide Promise) to provide airland and airdrop humanitarian airlift to war-torn areas of the former Yugoslavia.

On 1 October 1993 the 55 AAS and 58 AS were inactivated as part of the general drawdown of USAF units and installations in Europe at the end of the Cold War.  In February 1994, USAF began returning portions of Rhein-Main Air Base to German control and the wing's remaining airlift squadron was reassigned to the 86th Wing (86 WG) at Ramstein Air Base.  The 86th Wing was redesignated the 86th Airlift Wing on 1 October 1994.  The 435 AW was inactivated effective 1 April 1995 and its responsibilities at Rhein-Main turned over to the 469th Air Base Group under USAFE and the 626th Air Mobility Support Squadron under Air Mobility Command.  The last commander of the 435th Airlift Wing was Col Donald A. Philpitt, USAF.

Expeditionary status
The 435 AW was converted to a provisional expeditionary wing in February 2001, but was never activated as an expeditionary unit.  It was returned to regular status in December 2003.

Activation at Ramstein
In January 2004, the wing was reactivated as the 435th Air Base Wing and assumed the overall host base support responsibilities at Ramstein Air Base, Germany as a non-flying unit.

In mid 2009, the 435th Air Base Wing was redesignated the 435th Air Ground Operations Wing, the second wing of its kind in the USAF.  The 435th assumed mission areas previously performed by two 86th Airlift Wing units – the contingency response group and the air and space communications group – along with the 4th Air Support Operations Group at Heidelberg, Germany.  The 431st Air Base Group was inactivated during an earlier ceremony. The remaining mission areas of the 435th (e.g., base support of Ramstein) were merged back into the 86th Airlift Wing.

Lineage
 Established as 435th Troop Carrier Wing, Medium on 10 May 1949
 Activated in the reserve on 26 June 1949
 Ordered to active service on 1 March 1951
 Inactivated on 1 December 1952
 Activated in the reserve on 1 December 1952
 Redesignated 435th Troop Carrier Wing, Heavy on 18 September 1961
 Ordered to active service on 1 October 1961
 Relieved from active service on 27 August 1962
 Redesignated 435th Troop Carrier Wing, Medium on 1 July 1963
 Discontinued and inactivated, on 1 December 1965
 Redesignated as 435th Military Airlift Support Wing on 25 November 1968
 Activated on 24 December 1968
 Redesignated 435th Tactical Airlift Wing on 1 July 1975
 Redesignated 435th Airlift Wing on 1 April 1992
 Inactivated on 1 April 1995
 Redesignated 435th Air Expeditionary Wing and converted to provisional status on 5 February 2001
 Returned to permanent status on 10 December 2003
 Redesignated 435th Air Base Wing on 15 December 2003
 Activated on 15 January 2004
 Redesignated 435th Air Ground Operations Wing on 16 July 2009

Assignments

 Fourteenth Air Force, 26 July 1949
 Tactical Air Command, 2 March 1951
 Eighteenth Air Force, 1 June 1951 – 1 December 1952
 Fourteenth Air Force, 1 December 1952
 Third Air Force Reserve Region, 15 July 1960
 Ninth Air Force, 1 October 1961
 Third Air Force Reserve Region, 27 August 1962 – 1 December 1965
 Twenty-First Air Force, 24 December 1968

 322d Airlift Division, 23 June 1978
 United States Air Forces in Europe, 1 April 1992
 Seventeenth Air Force, 1 February 1993 – 1 April 1995
 United States Air Forces in Europe to activate or inactivate any time after 5 February 2001.
 Third Air Force, 15 January 2004
 United States Air Forces in Europe, 1 November 2005
 Air Command Europe, 18 November 2005
 Third Air Force (Air Forces Europe), 1 December 2006 – present

Components
Groups
 4th Air Support Operations Group
 435th Troop Carrier Group (later 435th Tactical Airlift Group, 435th Operations Group): 26 June 1949 – 1 December 1952; 1 December 1952 – 14 April 1959; 1 July 1975 – 23 June 1978; 15 September 1978 – 1 June 1980; 1 April 1992 – 1 April 1995
 435th Contingency Response Group Lineage
 435th Air and Space Communications Group
 908th Troop Carrier Group: 18 March 1963 – 1 December 1965
 915th Troop Carrier Group: 17 January 1963 – 1 December 1965
 916th Troop Carrier Group: 17 January - 18 March 1963
 917th Troop Carrier Group: 17 January - 1 July 1963

Squadrons
 37th Tactical Airlift Squadron (later 37th Airlift Squadron): 1 October 1977 – 15 December 1978; 1 June 1980 – 1 April 1992
 2nd Aeromedical Evacuation Squadron: 31 March 1975 – 15 December 1978; 1 June 1980 – 1 April 1992
 58th Military Airlift Squadron: 1 September 1977 – 23 June 1978
 76th Troop Carrier Squadron: 14 April 1959 – 1 October 1961; 27 August 1962 – 17 January 1963
 77th Troop Carrier Squadron: 14 April 1959 – 17 January 1963
 78th Troop Carrier Squadron: 8 May 1959 – 17 January 1963

Stations
 Miami International Airport, Florida, 26 June 1949 – 1 December 1952; 1 December 1952
 Homestead Air Force Base, Florida, 25 July 1960 – 1 December 1965
 RAF High Wycombe, England, 24 December 1968
 Rhein-Main Air Base, Germany, 1 July 1969 – 1 April 1995
 Ramstein Air Base, Germany, 15 January 2004 – present

Aircraft

 Curtiss C-46 Commando, 1949–1951; 1952–1957
 Fairchild C-119 Flying Boxcar, 1951–1952; 1957–1965
 Douglas C-124 Globemaster II, 1961–1963
 Lockheed C-130 Hercules, 1975–1994
 Douglas C-9A Nightingale, 1975–1993

 Boeing VC-135, 1977–1978
 Lockheed VC-140, 1977–1978
 Beechcraft C-12 Huron, 1978
 North American CT-39 Sabreliner, 1978
 Lockheed C-141 Starlifter, 1994

References
 Notes

Bibliography

External links

Wings of the United States Air Force
Wing 0435
Military units and formations established in 2009